Pamba was king of Hatti, an ancient Bronze Age state from the pre-Hittite period, situated in central regions of Anatolia, modern Turkey. He is mentioned in only one source, a Hittite version (from  1400 BCE) of an older Akkadian story, that narrates several events related to much earlier times, taking place during the rule of great king Naram-Sin of Akkad (23rd century BCE). The story describes a war between the Akkadian ruler and an alliance of 17 kings, and the Hittite version includes Pamba of Hatti among those kings. That inclusion is not attested in Akkadian versions of the story, nor in contemporary sources, that would date from the period of the Akkadian Empire, but some scholars hold that Hittite version (from  1400 BCE) is conditionally reliable, and probably derived from some local sources. In that case, the narrative would contain a trustworthy tradition, and thus provide a base for an assumption that the ancient Kingdom of Hatti existed already during the period of the Akkadian Empire.

Rulers

See also

 Hattians
 Hittites

References

Sources

External links
 Hattian Early Period

Hattian kings
23rd-century BC rulers